Joan Oriol Gràcia (born 5 November 1986) is a Spanish professional footballer who plays for Gimnàstic de Tarragona as a left-back.

Club career
Born in Cambrils, Tarragona, Catalonia, Oriol played lower league or amateur football in his first four years as a senior. In the 2008–09 season he helped Villarreal CF's B-team promote to Segunda División for the first time ever, scoring two goals in 32 games.

Oriol made his debut for the main squad on 6 January 2010, playing the full 90 minutes and being booked in a 1–1 away draw against RC Celta de Vigo in the round of 16 of the Copa del Rey. On 27 November of that year he made his first appearance in La Liga, starting in a 3–0 victory at Real Zaragoza.

From 2011 to 2013, Oriol was both relegated and promoted with the Yellow Submarine, featuring in an average of 22 matches in the process. On 2 July 2013 the free agent signed a three-year contract with CA Osasuna, with a €5 million clause.

In early August 2014, following Osasuna's relegation, Oriol agreed to a one-year deal with the option of a further year with Football League Championship side Blackpool, linking up with his twin brother Eduard. On 12 January 2015, his contract was terminated by mutual consent.

On 4 July 2015, after a short spell at FC Rapid București in Romania, Oriol signed a two-year contract with RCD Mallorca. On 31 August 2017, after being relegated to the Segunda División B, he agreed to a 1+1 deal at Atromitos F.C. from Greece.

Oriol returned to Spain in January 2018, signing for UE Cornellà of the third division. He remained in that tier the following years, representing Lleida Esportiu and Gimnàstic de Tarragona.

Personal life
Oriol's twin brother, Eduard, was also a footballer. A winger, he shared teams with his sibling on several occasions.

Career statistics

Club

References

External links

1986 births
Living people
People from Baix Camp
Spanish twins
Twin sportspeople
Sportspeople from the Province of Tarragona
Spanish footballers
Footballers from Catalonia
Association football defenders
La Liga players
Segunda División players
Segunda División B players
Tercera División players
Primera Federación players
CF Pobla de Mafumet footballers
CF Reus Deportiu players
CF Gavà players
Villarreal CF B players
Villarreal CF players
CA Osasuna players
RCD Mallorca players
UE Cornellà players
Lleida Esportiu footballers
Gimnàstic de Tarragona footballers
English Football League players
Blackpool F.C. players
Liga I players
FC Rapid București players
Atromitos F.C. players
Spanish expatriate footballers
Expatriate footballers in England
Expatriate footballers in Romania
Expatriate footballers in Greece
Spanish expatriate sportspeople in England
Spanish expatriate sportspeople in Romania
Spanish expatriate sportspeople in Greece